Reńska Wieś , German: Reinschdorf, is a village in Kędzierzyn-Koźle County, Opole Voivodeship, in south-western Poland in the region of Upper Silesia. It is the seat of the gmina (administrative district) of the same name.

A substantial German population lives in the village, and it is officially bilingual in German and Polish.

The village has a population of 1,800.

History
The village was first mentioned in 1532 as Rinska. Since 1742, after the defeat of Austria in the First Silesian War, Reinschdorf belonged to Prussia and in 1816 it was assigned to Landkreis Cosel.

The early 19th and 20th centuries saw a revival of the town, as Reinschdorf was located on the road between Leobschütz and Cosel, which had become one of the largest inland ports in the German Empire. In 1864 a large sugar mill was built in the town, and in 1882 Reinschdorf was connected to the rail network.

Until 1928, the town was parochially administered by the parish of St. Sigismund in Cosel. Though a small neo-Gothic chapel was built in 1861, the town only received its own church in 1924-1926. The present Church of St. Urban was built in 1979-1980.

In the Upper Silesian plebiscite of 20 March 1921, 940 villagers (87.6%) voted to remain with Germany, while only 133 people voted to join the newly created state of Poland. As a result, Reinschdorf remained in Germany as part of the Weimar Republic.

After the Second World War, the Red Army occupied the village, and the town was renamed Reńska Wies as part of a campaign to Polonize Silesia, which had been annexed to Poland as agreed at the Yalta Conference. However, since unlike many other areas of Silesia the German population had not been completely expelled, there remained a substantial German minority, and since 26 October 2006 the town and commune have been officially bilingual. On January 11, 2011 the old German name Reinschdorf was again made official.

References

Villages in Kędzierzyn-Koźle County